VIT-AP University is a private university located in Inavolu, Amaravati, the capital of Andhra Pradesh, India. It is the first private university established by Vellore Institute of Technology located in Amaravati.

History 
Foundation stone was laid by former chief minister Nara Chandrababu Naidu on November 3,2016 at Ainavolu as a part of new education district in the planned capital. The state government had allocated 200 acres of land for the VIT University campus in Amaravati. 

The Campus was inaugurated on Nov 28th, 2017 by Vice president Venkaiah Naidu along with the chief minister opening two newly constructed blocks.

Academics 
The university offers bachelor's degrees in engineering and business. 

At VIT-AP the entire teaching-learning process is concentrated around six schools.

VIT-AP has also signed an agreement for a joint degree program with the Arizona State University.

Admission
VIT admits bachelor students through its own engineering entrance exam, called the Vellore Institute of Technology Engineering Entrance Examination (VITEEE). It is conducted every year in the month of April and May. The exam has been conducted online since 2013 and in 2018, 212,000 students have registered. VITEEE 2021 was held on 28, 29 and 31 May.

SCOPE

The Department of Computer Science and Engineering was established in 2017. It has become the School of Computer Science and Engineering (SCOPE) in January 2019. At present, the School is headed by Dr. Sudha SV with 3565 students, 79 faculty and 94 research scholars.

SENSE

The Department of Electronics and Communication Engineering was established in 2017. It has become the School of Electronics Engineering (SENSE) in January 2019. At present, the School is headed by Dr. Umakanta Nanda with 766 students, 56 faculty and 101 research scholars.

SMEC

SAS

VSB

VISH

VSL

See also
Vellore Institute of Technology
VIT Bhopal University

References

Universities in Andhra Pradesh
Private universities in India
2017 establishments in Andhra Pradesh
Educational institutions established in 2017